Vandalia Municipal Airport is a civil, public use airport located 3 miles northwest of Vandalia, Illinois. The airport is publicly owned by the Vandalia Park District, which also manages the fixed-base operator (FBO) on the field.

Facilities
The airport has two asphalt runways. Runway 18/35 is 3751 x 100 ft (1143 x 30 m), and runway 9/27 is 3001 x 75 ft (915 x 23 m).

The airport has a number of hangars and storage facilities for its based aircraft. In 2019, a tornado destroyed some of these facilities and the aircraft stored inside them.

The FBO offers services including self-serve fuel, a pilot's lounge, and a courtesy car.

In 2021, the Illinois Department of Transportation awarded Vandalia Airport $300,000 for pavement maintenance as part of its Airport Improvement Program.

Aircraft
For the 12-month period ending March 31, 2020, the airport has 25 aircraft operations per day, or about 9000 per year. This is 99% general aviation and <1% air taxi. For the same time period, there are 13 aircraft based on the field: 12 single-engine and 1 multi-engine airplane.

References 

Airports in Illinois